Wola Wereszczyńska  is a village in the administrative district of Gmina Urszulin, within Włodawa County, Lublin Voivodeship, in eastern Poland.

References

Villages in Włodawa County
Siedlce Governorate
Kholm Governorate
Lublin Voivodeship (1919–1939)